Morlachs ( or , ;) has been an exonym used for a rural Christian community in Herzegovina, Lika and the Dalmatian Hinterland. The term was initially used for a bilingual Vlach pastoralist community in the mountains of Croatia in the second half of the 14th until the early 16th century. Then, when the community straddled the Venetian–Ottoman border until in the 17th century, it only referred to Slavic-speaking, mainly Eastern Orthodox but also Roman Catholic people. The Vlach i.e. Morlach population of  Herzegovina and Dalmatian hinterland from the Venetian and Turkish side were of either Roman Catholic or Christian Orthodox faith. Venetian sources from 17th and 18th century make no distinction between Orthodox and Catholics, they refer to both groupings as Morlachs. The exonym ceased to be used in an ethnic sense by the end of the 18th century, and came to be viewed as derogatory, but has been renewed as a social or cultural anthropological subject. As the nation-building of the 19th century proceeded, the Vlach/Morlach population residing with the Croats and Serbs of the Dalmatian Hinterland espoused either a Serb or Croat ethnic identity, but preserved some common sociocultural outlines.

Etymology

The word Morlach is derived from Italian Morlacco and Latin Morlachus or Murlachus, being cognate to Greek Μαυροβλάχοι Maurovlachoi, meaning "Black Vlachs" (from Greek μαύρο mauro meaning "dark", "black"). The Serbo-Croatian term in its singular form is Morlak; its plural form is Morlaci [mor-latsi]. In some 16th-century redactions of the Doclean Chronicle, they are referred to as "Morlachs or Nigri Latini" (Black Latins). Petar Skok suggested it derived from the Latin maurus and Greek maurós ("dark"), the diphthongs au and av indicating a Dalmato-Romanian lexical remnant.

Dimitrie Cantemir, in his History of the Growth and Decay of the Ottoman Empire remarks that when Moldavia was subdued to the Ottoman Rule by Bogdan III, Moldavia was referred to by the Ottomans as "Ak iflac", or Ak Vlach (i.e., White Wallachians), while the Wallachians were known as "Kara iflac", or Kara Vlach, (i.e., Black Wallachians).
"Black Vlachs" can in fact mean "Northern Vlachs", because the Turkish word "kara" means black but also means North in old Turkish.

There are several interpretations of the ethnonym and phrase "moro/mavro/mauro vlasi". The direct translation of the name Morovlasi in Serbo-Croatian would mean Black Vlachs. It was considered that "black" referred to their clothes of brown cloth. The 17th-century Venetian Dalmatian historian Johannes Lucius suggested that it actually meant "Black Latins", compared to "White Romans" in coastal areas. The 18th-century writer Alberto Fortis in his book Viaggio in Dalmazia ("Journey to Dalmatia", 1774), in which he wrote extensively about the Morlachs, thought that it derived from the Slavic more ("sea") – morski Vlasi meaning "Sea Vlachs". 18th-century writer Ivan Lovrić, observing Fortis' work, thought that it came from "more" (sea) and "(v)lac(s)i" (strong) ("strongmen by the sea"), and mentioned how the Greeks called Upper Vlachia Maurovlachia and that the Morlachs would have brought that name with them. Cicerone Poghirc and Ela Cosma offer a similar interpretation that it meant "Northern Latins", derived from the Indo-European practice of indicating cardinal directions by colors. Other theories suggest that it refers from the Morea peninsula, or, according to Dominik Mandić, from African Maurs.

Origin and culture

The etymology of the exonym points to a connection with Vlachs, but as stated in Fortis' work Viaggio in Dalmazia, they were at that time Slavic-speaking. Because of migrations from various parts of the Balkans, the name had passed to later communities. The Morlach people were both of the Eastern Orthodox and Roman Catholic faith.
According to Dana Caciur the Morlach community from the Venetian view as long as they share a specific lifestyle can represent a mixture of Vlachs, Croatians, Serbs, Bosnians, etc. Venetian term "Morlach" in the 16th century usually referred to the whole subject population of the Ottoman hinterland regardless of their ethnic identity and whether or not they were peasants, stockherders or military colonists.

Fortis spotted the physical difference between Morlachs; those from around Kotor, Sinj and Knin were generally blond-haired, with blue eyes, and broad faces, while those around Zadvarje and Vrgorac were generally brown-haired with narrow faces. They also differed in nature. Although they were often seen by urban dwellers as strangers and "those people" from the periphery, in 1730 provveditore Zorzi Grimani described them as "ferocious, but not indomitable" by nature, Edward Gibbon called them "barbarians", and Fortis praised their "noble savagery", moral, family, and friendship virtues, but also complained about their persistence in keeping to old traditions. He found that they sang melancholic verses of epic poetry related to the Ottoman occupation, accompanied with the traditional single stringed instrument called gusle. Fortis gave translation of folk song Hasanaginica at the and of his book. Manfred Beller and Joep Leerssen identified the cultural traits of the Morlachs as being part of the South Slavic and Serb ethnotype.

They made their living as shepherds and merchants, as well as soldiers. They neglected agricultural work, usually did not have gardens and orchards besides those growing naturally, and had for the time old farming tools, Lovrić explaining it as: "what our ancestors did not do, neither will we". Morlach families had herds numbering from 200 to 600, while the poorer families around 40 to 50, from which they received milk, and made various dairy products.

Contemporary I. Lovrić said that the Morlachs were Slavs who spoke better Slavic than the Ragusans (owing to the growing Italianization of the Dalmatian coast). Boško Desnica (1886–1945), after analysing Venetian papers, concluded that the Venetians undifferentiated the Slavic people in Dalmatia and labeled the language and script of the region as "Illirico" (Illyrian) or "Serviano" ["Serbian," particularly when referring to the language of the Morlachs or Vlachs in Dalmatia]. Language, idiom, characters/letters are always accompanied by the adjective Serb or Illyrian, when it is a matter of the military always is used term "cavalry (cavalleria) croata", "croato", "militia (milizia) croata" while the term "Slav" (schiavona) was used for the population. Lovrić made no distinction between the Vlachs/Morlachs and the Dalmatians and Montenegrins, whom he considered Slavs, and was not at all bothered by the fact that the Morlachs were predominantly Orthodox Christian. Fortis noted that there was often conflict between the Catholic and Orthodox Morlachs.
However some of Morlachs have passed to Islam during Turkish occupation Mile Bogović says in his book that records of that time referred entire population along the  Turkish-Venetian border in Dalmatia as Morlachs. Many historians mostly Serbian used name Morlak and simply translate as Serb. Almost the only difference between the Morlachs was their religious affiliation: Catholics and Orthodox. Recent research found that Vlachs or Morlachs had an important contribution to the apparition of necropolises with decorated tombstones.

In his book, Viaggio in Dalmazia, Fortis presented the poetry of the Morlachs. He also published several specimens of Morlach songs. Fortis believed that the Morlachs preserved their old customs and clothes. Their ethnographic traits were traditional clothings, use of the gusle musical instrument accompanied with epic singing. Fortis' work started a literary movement in Italian, Ragusan and Venetian literature: Morlachism, dedicated at the Morlachs, their customs and several other aspects of them.

History

Early history
The use of Morlachs is first attested in 1344, when Morolacorum are mentioned in lands around Knin and Krbava during the conflict between the counts of the Kurjaković and Nelipić families. The first mention of the term Morlachs is simultaneous with the appearance of Vlachs in the documents of Croatia in the early 14th century; in 1321, a local priest on the island of Krk granted land to the church ("to the lands of Kneže, which are called Vlach"), while in 1322 Vlachs were allied with Mladen Šubić at the battle in the hinterland of Trogir. According to Mužić in those early documents there is no identifiable differentiation between the terms Vlach and Morlach. In 1352, in the agreement in which Zadar sold salt to the Republic of Venice, Zadar retained part of the salt that Morlachi and others exported by land. In 1362, the Morlachorum,  settled, without authorization, on lands of Trogir and used it for pasture for a few months. In the Statute of Senj dating to 1388, the Frankopans mentioned Morowlachi and defined the amount of time they had for pasture when they descended from the mountains. In 1412, the Murlachos captured the Ostrovica Fortress from Venice. In August 1417, Venetian authorities were concerned with the "Morlachs and other Slavs" from the hinterland, who were a threat to security in Šibenik. Authorities of Šibenik in 1450 gave permission to enter the city to Morlachs and some Vlachs who called themselves Croats who were in the same economic and social position at that time.

According to scholar Fine, the early Vlachs probably lived on Croatian territory even before the 14th century, being the progeny of romanized Illyrians and pre-Slavic Romance-speaking people. During the 14th century, Vlach settlements existed throughout much of today's Croatia, from the northern island Krk, around the Velebit and Dinara mountains, and along the southern rivers Krka and Cetina. Those Vlachs had, by the end of the 14th and 15th century, lost, their Romance language, or were at least bilingual. As they adopted Slavic language, the only characteristic "Vlach" element was their pastoralism. The so-called Istro-Romanians continued to speak their Romance language on the island of Krk and villages around Lake Čepić in Istria, while other communities in the mountains above the lake preserved the Shtokavian-Chakavian dialect with Ikavian accent from the southern Velebit and area of Zadar. Today's Istro-Romanians may be a residual branch of the Morlachs.

The Istro-Romanians, and other Vlachs (or Morlachs), had settled Istria (and mountain Ćićarija) after the various devastating outbreaks of the plague and wars between 1400 and 1600, reaching the island of Krk. In 1465 and 1468, there are mentions of "Morlach" judge Gerg Bodolić and "Vlach" peasant Mikul, in Krk and Crikvenica, respectively. In the second half of the 15th century, Catholic Morlachs (mostly Croatian Vlachs) migrated from the area of southern Velebit and Dinara area to the island of Krk, together with some Balkan Romance-speaking population. The Venetian colonization of Istria (and Ćićarija) occurred not later than the early 1520s, and there were several cases when "Vlachs" returned to Dalmatia.

16th century
As many former inhabitants of the Croatian-Ottoman borderland fled northwards or were captured by the Ottoman invaders, they left unpopulated areas. The Austrian Empire established the Military Frontiers in 1522, which served as a buffer against Ottoman incursions. At the time, "Vlachs", served both in the conquesting Ottoman armies, and Austria and Venice, and were settled by both sides. During the 16th century Slavicized Vlachs, other Vlachs and Serbs fled from Ottoman territory and came to Dalmatia and the Military Frontier.

In 1579, several groups of Morlachs, understood as a Serb tribe in Dalmatia, immigrated and requested to be employed as military colonists. Initially, there were some tensions between these immigrants and the established Uskoks. In 1593, provveditore generale (Overseer) Cristoforo Valier mentioned three nations constituting the Uskoks: the "natives of Senj, Croatians, and Morlachs from the Turkish parts".

The name "Morlach" entered toponymy; the Velebit mountain was called Montagne della Morlacca ("mountain of the Morlachs"), while the Velebit Channel was called Canale della Morlacca.

From the 16th century onward, the historical term changes meaning, as in most Venetian documents, Morlachs are now usually called immigrants, both Orthodox and Catholic, from the Ottoman-conquered territories in the Western Balkans (chiefly Bosnia and Herzegovina). These settled in the Venetian-Ottoman frontier, in the hinterlands of coastal cities, and entered Venetian military service by the early 17th century.

17th century
 
At the time of the Cretan War (1645–69) and Morean War (1684–99), a large number of Morlachs settled inland of the Dalmatian towns, and Ravni Kotari of Zadar. They were skilled in warfare and familiar with local territory, and served as paid soldiers in both Venetian and Ottoman armies. Their activity was similar to that of the Uskoks. Their military service granted them land, and freed them from trials, and gave them rights which freed them from full debt law (only 1/10 yield), thus many joined the so-called "Morlach" or "Vlach" armies.

At the time, some notable Morlach military leaders who were also enumerated in epic poetry, were: Janko Mitrović, Ilija and Stojan Janković, Petar, Ilija and Franjo Smiljanić, Stjepan and Marko Sorić, Vuk Mandušić, Ilija Perajica, Šimun Bortulačić, Božo Milković, Stanislav Sočivica, and Counts Franjo and Juraj Posedarski. Divided by religion, the Mitrović-Janković family were the leaders of Orthodox Morlachs, while the Smiljanić family were leaders of Catholic Morlachs.

After the dissolution of the Republic of Venice in 1797, and loss of power in Dalmatia, the term Morlach would disappear from use.

Legacy 
During the time of Enlightenment and Romanticism, Morlachs were seen as the "model of primitive Slavdom", and the "spirits of pastoral Arcadia Morlacchia". They attracted the attention of travel writers like 17th-century Jacob Spon and Sir George Wheler, and 18th-century writers Johann Gottfried Herder and Johann Wolfgang von Goethe, who labeled their poems as "Morlackisch". In 1793, at the carnival in Venice, a play about Morlachs, Gli Antichi Slavi ("antique Slavs"), was performed, and in 1802 it was reconceived as a ballet Le Nozze dei Morlacchi. At the beginning of the 20th century, still seen as relics from the primitive past and a byword for barbarous people, they may have inspired science fiction novelist H. G. Wells in his depiction of the fictional Morlocks. Thomas Graham Jackson described Morlach women as half-savages wearing "embroidered leggings thet give them the appearance of Indian squaws". In the 20th century, Alice Moque, as did many other women travelers, in her 1914 travelogue Delightful Dalmatia emphasized the "barbaric gorgeousness" of the sight of Morlach women and men in their folk costumes, which "made Zara's Piazza look like a stage setting", and regretted the coming of new civilization.

In the Balkans, the term became derogatory, indicating people from the mountains and backward people, and became disliked by the Morlachs themselves. 

Italian cheese Morlacco, also named as Morlak, Morlach, Burlach, or Burlacco, was named after Morlach herders and woodsmen who lived and made it in the region of Monte Grappa. "Morlacchi" remains attested as an Italian family name.

See also
Morlacchi
Vlachs of Croatia
Statuta Valachorum
Morlachs (Venetian irregulars)
Vlach (Ottoman social class)

Annotations

References

Sources
Books
 
 
 
 
 
 
 
 
 
 

Journals

External links

 

 
Eastern Romance peoples in Croatia
Eastern Romance people
Historical ethnic groups of Europe
Republic of Venice people
South Slavic history
History of Dalmatia
Military Frontier
16th- and 17th-century warrior types
16th century in Croatia
17th century in Croatia
Cretan War (1645–1669)
Venetian period in the history of Croatia
Communities in medieval Bosnia